The Last Great Wilderness is a 2002 film directed by David Mackenzie. It stars Alastair Mackenzie and Jonathan Phillips. It was produced by Gillian Berrie at Sigma Films. Scottish band The Pastels provided the soundtrack, which was released as an album in 2003.

Cast
Alastair Mackenzie as Charlie
Jonathan Phillips as Vincente
Ewan Stewart as Magnus
David Hayman as Ruaridh
Victoria Smurfit as Claire
Martin Bell as William

References

External links

2002 films
Films directed by David Mackenzie (director)
2000s road comedy-drama films
British road comedy-drama films
2002 comedy films
2002 drama films
2000s English-language films
2000s British films